"Dogs" is the third single from Damien Rice's second album 9. The single was released in Ireland as a digital download on 24 August 2007, then in the UK on 17 September 2007, where it charted at number 88. The single is the first release since Damien and Lisa Hannigan parted ways. The single mix for the song is much more upbeat and has noticeable drum beats.

Track listing
CD:
 "Dogs" (Remix)
 "Childish" (Live At Wisseloord Studios)

7" vinyl #1 (gatefold sleeve):
 "Dogs" (Remix)
 "Elephant" (Live at Wisseloord Studios)

7" vinyl #2 (poster sleeve):
 "Dogs" (Remix)
 "Accidental Babies" (Live at Wisseloord Studios)

References

Damien Rice songs
2007 singles
14th Floor Records singles
2006 songs
Songs written by Damien Rice